Crateva religiosa, the sacred garlic pear or temple plant, is a species of flowering tree. It is a member of the capers family. The tree is sometimes called the spider tree because the showy flowers bear long, spidery stamens. It is native to much of tropical Asia and several South Pacific islands. It is grown elsewhere for fruit, especially in parts of the African continent.

The nectar-filled flowers are attractive to a multitude of insects and birds. A pierid butterfly, Hebomoia glaucippe, is a frequent visitor to this plant. 

The chemical compound lupeol can be extracted from the bark of C. Religiosa.

References

Capparaceae
Flora of tropical Asia
Flora of the Pacific